Litorimonas cladophorae is a Gram-negative, strictly aerobic and rod-shaped bacterium from the genus of Litorimonas which has been isolated from the alga Cladophora stimpsoni.

References 

Rhodobacterales
Bacteria described in 2013